The Libra Group, aka Libra Holdings, is a privately held international conglomerate operating in a variety of industries. As of 2017, it has 30 subsidiaries across six continents, in six sectors: aviation leasing, renewable energy, hotels and hospitality services, real estate, financial services and diversified investments, and shipping.

The company was established by the Logothetis family in 1976 as a shipping company under the name of Lomar Shipping. In order to diversify, In 2003 the Libra Group was established as its umbrella corporation, and in the mid-2000s it expanded into diverse industries. George Logothetis is the company's founder, Chairman, and CEO. The company is privately owned by the Logothetis family.

History

Lomar Shipping
The Libra Group's predecessor company, Lomar Shipping, was founded by Michael Logothetis in London in 1976. Michael Logothetis's son George Logothetis joined Lomar Shipping in 1993, and in 1995 he became the company's CEO. Over the next ten years, George enlarged Lomar's fleet from less than five to more than 70 ships.

Libra Group and diversification
In 2003, George Logothetis founded the Libra Group, based in New York and London, in order to diversify and expand the shipping company into new business areas. George remains Libra Group's Chairman and CEO.

At the time of the company's formation, international shipping was still its chief area of operations. Between 2004 and 2007, during a boom in the shipping business, the Libra Group sold off most of Lomar's ships. With the profit from the ship sales, the new company purchased a fleet of airplanes, which were at a cyclical low, and set up an aircraft leasing division, Lease Corporation International (LCI), which leases aircraft to airlines such as British Airways and Virgin Atlantic. The Libra Group repeated this successful "buy-low, sell-high" formula of going counter to prevailing market trends several times in the ensuing decade, building a large diversified multinational conglomerate empire out of the former small shipping company. Each of the company's new ventures was headed by existing top personnel or close associates.

Expansion
In 2006, the Libra Group started expanding beyond aviation. Its new major ventures included real estate, hotels and hospitality, and renewable energy.

In December 2009, after ship values slumped in the wake of the financial crisis, the Libra Group re-entered the shipping business and purchased Allocean and its fleet of 26 ships. From December 2009 through December 2013, the company purchased a total of 73 ships.

In 2009, the company also re-entered the aircraft leasing market when LCI purchased a new fleet of aircraft. In 2012, LCI expanded operations to include helicopter leasing as well.

The Libra Group has also expanded beyond its core businesses of shipping, aircraft leasing, real estate, hotels and hospitality, and renewable energy, to include a variety of interests including media, construction, service companies, and financial services. Between 2008 and 2014, the company purchased $7 billion to $7.5 billion of assets globally. As of 2017, the company owns and operates 30 subsidiary companies around the world.

Industry sectors and subsidiaries

Shipping
Lomar Shipping, the original predecessor to the Libra Group, is the company's shipping subsidiary. Between 2004 and 2007, at the height of a boom in the shipping business, the Libra Group sold Lomar's fleet of nearly 70 ships. The company made a substantial amount of money from the sales, which occurred before the 2008 financial crisis.

In December 2009, after ship values had slumped from the recession, Lomar purchased a new fleet and returned to the shipping sector, investing $1.4 billion in 91 vessels – mainly container ships – between 2009 and late 2014. As of late 2013, Lomar operated a fleet of nearly 60 ships, including bulk carriers, reefer ships, container ships, offshore support vessels, liquefied petroleum gas tankers, chemical tankers, platform supply vessels, anchor handling tug supply vessels, and product tankers.

In 2014, Lomar sold its entire fleet of six offshore support vessels for approximately $100 million, just before oil prices crashed; during this period the company sold additional vessels as well for another $100 million. Lomar purchased six container ships and two products tankers in December 2014, and seven more container ships in February 2015. As of 2017, Lomar has a total fleet of over 80 vessels.

Aviation leasing
Lease Corporation International (LCI), the Libra Group's aircraft leasing subsidiary, was founded in 2004. LCI offices are located in Ireland, the United Kingdom, and Singapore. The subsidiary leases fixed-wing aircraft to airlines in Europe and Asia, including Singapore Airlines, British Airways, Virgin Atlantic, Oman Air, and Hong Kong Express Airways. After selling its fleet of aircraft in 2007, LCI purchased new aircraft in 2009.

In 2012, LCI expanded into helicopter leasing. In 2014, LCI purchased nearly $1billion in helicopters from Airbus and AgustaWestland; in early 2015 it added 11 more helicopters from AgustaWestland. Helicopters leased by LCI are used for offshore oil operations, for commercial and governmental use, and for search and rescue as well as emergency medical services. Its lease clients in early 2015 included Westpac Rescue Helicopter Service and Australian Helicopters in Australia, and HeliService International in Germany.

Hotels and hospitality
The Libra Group has several hotel subsidiaries, which operate luxury hotels worldwide. The company owns Grace Hotels, an international luxury-hotel management company that began in Greece. The hotel chain's first location, Mykonos Grace, received the highest award at the 2007 European Hotel Design Awards. The Grace Santorini was in Condé Nast Travelers Gold List in 2012, and the Vanderbilt Grace in Newport, Rhode Island was listed in Tatlers top 14 hotels in the U.S. in 2015.

Other hotel companies owned by the Libra Group include Aria Hotels in Greece, and hotels managed by Libra Group's holding companies First Oriental Thailand, LHG, and Elandis. LHG is Libra Group's holding company for worldwide hotel and restaurant ownership, management and development. Elandis develops, owns, and manages real estate, including hotels and hospitality, throughout the Americas and Europe; in 2016 it opened the first Hyatt Place hotel in Brazil.

Renewable energy
The Libra Group owns two renewable-energy subsidiaries. EuroEnergy, based in Greece, operates solar, wind and biogas energy plants. Greenwood Energy, based in the U.S., develops and produces renewable fuels including biofuels and fuel pellets, and provides fuel cell energy and combined fuel-cell heat and power plants, for utilities and for industrial customers including hotels, university campuses, and other public buildings. The Greenwood renewable-fuels sector is now called Convergen. Greenwood also has a solar-power engineering, procurement, and construction division, called Greenwood Biosar. In 2014 Greenwood Biosar built Panama's first utility-scale solar power plant. Greenwood's solar division expanded significantly in 2014, and as of February 2015 it has a nearly 3 GW pipeline of renewable-energy projects, mainly in Latin America.

Real estate
The Libra Group's real estate subsidiaries are involved in the development and management of residential, retail, commercial, and hospitality properties worldwide. The company operates a real estate brokerage, management, and consulting services firm, Singapore Residential. It also owns First Oriental, which is involved in real estate development in Southeast Asia through its subsidiaries First Oriental Thailand and First Oriental Singapore. In Greece, the Libra Group owns a Sotheby's International Realty office, a luxury real estate brokerage. Other real estate subsidiaries include Elandis, Mayfair Investments, Mayfair Land and Development, and Palmerston Real Estate.

Financial services and diversified investments
Libra Group's financial services subsidiaries include the investment companies Riposte Capital and Peninsula Group. Libra previously also held LXM Group, a financial services provider.

In total Libra Group owns 30 subsidiaries around the world. Its diversified companies, which fall outside of its main areas of operation, include Principal Media, a film and television company based in Los Angeles, and Fifth Element Design, a comprehensive interior-design service for private and corporate clients, focusing on the residential and hospitality industry. The Libra Group also has a 50% stake in the luxury natural-fiber mattress and home furnishings company COCO-MAT.

Corporate affairs

Operations
The Libra Group's headquarters are located in London and New York. The company also operates 25 additional offices worldwide, including locations in Miami, Beijing, Buenos Aires, and Athens.

As of 2017, the company owns and operates 30 subsidiary companies around the world. The major subsidiaries operate in six separate industries: aviation leasing;  renewable energy; hotels and hospitality services; real estate; shipping; and financial services and diversified investments.

In addition, several of Libra Group's subsidiaries are responsible for the management and oversight of subsidiaries within a specific geographic region. Some of these include First Mediterranean Investments, a holding company for specialist investment companies focused on the Southeastern Mediterranean and Balkan regions; and First Oriental Investments, a specialist real estate investment and development company for Southeast Asia. The Libra Group also operates Libra Capital and Libra Group Services, providing investment-management and legal, accounting, marketing, and administrative services to other Libra Group subsidiaries.

Leadership
The Libra Group is privately owned by the Logothetis family, whose members fill several key roles in the organization. George Logothetis is the company's Chairman and CEO. Constantine Logothetis is the Executive Vice Chairman of the Libra Group. Adamantios Tomazos is the Senior Executive Board Member, and was a founding director of Lease Corporation International, the international commercial aircraft leasing subsidiary of the Libra Group. Nicholas Logothetis is a member of the board of directors. Former United States ambassador John Negroponte is a director of Libra Group and an advisor to the board. Leon Logothetis is the former head of the company’s Los Angeles–based film company Principal Media. Fidel Andueza was Head of Americas at Libra Group, overseeing the strategic direction of the company's interests in North, South, and Central America. Phaedra Chrousos is currently Chief Strategy Officer.

Philanthropies
The Libra Group is involved in several education, mentorship, and social projects. In partnership with the American College of Greece and the Greek America Foundation, the company established an internship program in 2011 to facilitate study abroad and work-experience programs for Greek and Greek-American students. In 2012, the company pledged €5 million to create the Hellenic Initiative's Hellenic Entrepreneurship Award, which provides mentorship and funding to Greek entrepreneurs; as of 2017, the Libra Group has committed €10million to supporting entrepreneurship in Greece through the award. The company also launched the American Entrepreneurship Award,  for U.S. communities facing a disproportionate lack of opportunity – initially Bronx, New York and Miami-Dade County, Florida – in 2016.

Some of its other programs include the Seleni Institute for women's maternal physical and mental health, the Grace Foundation which supports charities globally, and the HOME Project which aids refugees and provides safe shelters for unaccompanied refugee children.

The Libra Group is a founding sponsor of the My Brother's Keeper (MBK) Alliance, launched in May 2015 by President Obama. The MBK Alliance helps young men of color throughout the U.S. reach their full potential, by  ensuring and improving educational and workplace opportunities. As part of its involvement with the original My Brother's Keeper Initiative launched by Obama in February 2014, the Libra Group has partnered with Leadership Enterprise for a Diverse America (LEDA) by providing internship placements for young men of color at Libra and its global subsidiaries. In 2016 the company pledged funds, services, and resources to the Obama administration's Partnership for Refugees to aid the global refugee crisis. It also signed the Obama administration's Equal Pay Pledge to pay women commensurately with men and eliminate gender-based hiring bias.

References

External links
Official site

Conglomerate companies of the United States
Conglomerate companies of the United Kingdom
Aircraft leasing companies
Hospitality companies of the United States
Real estate companies of the United States
Renewable energy companies of Europe
Renewable energy companies of the United States
Shipping companies of the United Kingdom
American companies established in 2003
British companies established in 2003
Conglomerate companies established in 2003
Holding companies established in 2003
Energy companies established in 2003
Renewable resource companies established in 2003
Shipping companies of the United States